Mark Regev (born 1960) is a former Israeli diplomat and civil servant who is currently the chair of the Abba Eban Institute for Diplomacy and Foreign Relations at Reichman University. Between June 2020 and April 2021, he served as the Prime Minister's Senior Advisor for Foreign Affairs and International Communications. From 2016 to 2020 Regev was Ambassador of Israel to the United Kingdom. Previously, he was the International Spokesperson for the Prime Minister's Office (2007 to 2016).  Most recently he was a visiting fellow at the Institute for National Security Studies. In September 2021, Regev started writing a weekly column in the Jerusalem Post.

Early life
Regev was born Mark Freiberg in Melbourne, Australia in 1960 to Martin and Freda Freiberg. He was educated at Mount Scopus Memorial College, a Jewish day school in Melbourne. He received his bachelor's degree in political science and history at Melbourne University, and master's degrees in political science from the Hebrew University of Jerusalem, and in management from Boston University.

In his youth, Freiberg was a prominent member of the Socialist Zionist youth movement Ichud Habonim and was active in the Melbourne University Jewish Students Society. In 1982, he emigrated to Israel and worked at kibbutz Tel Katzir. In Israel, he Hebraicized his surname from Freiberg to Regev. He served as a combat soldier in the Nahal Brigade of the Israel Defense Forces.

Career

Regev began his career as a lecturer on international relations and strategy at the Israel Defense Forces Staff College. He joined Israel's Ministry of Foreign Affairs in 1990, serving as deputy chief of mission at the Consulate General in Hong Kong, and spokesman at the Israeli Embassy in Beijing. He also served as spokesman at the Embassy in Washington, D.C. Regev was the spokesman for the Ministry of Foreign Affairs in Jerusalem from 2004 to 2007.

Regev has both received prominence and criticism in international media when he presented the Israeli position in numerous interviews to English language TV and radio channels during the 2006 Lebanon War, the 2008–09 Gaza War, the 2012 Operation Pillar of Defense, the 2014 Israel–Gaza conflict and Operation Brother's Keeper, and the 2021 Operation Guardian of the Walls.

As ambassador, Regev was involved in interfaith activities. He hosted an iftar dinner at his residence for members of Britain’s Muslim leadership.

Regev is married to Vered Regev and they have three children.

References

External links

 Transcript of a radio interview with Regev WNYC 6 April 2002
 Regev answers questions about Israeli policy USA Today 3 May 2002
 Transcript of a radio interview with Regev ABC 22 December 2005
 Mark Regev: The one-man Israeli defence force who is set to become ambassador to Britain Independent 14 August 2015
 The Aussie boy who's at home spruiking for Israel Sydney Morning Herald 22 July 2018

1960 births
Living people
Date of birth missing (living people)
Ambassadors of Israel to the United Kingdom
Australian emigrants to Israel
Australian Jews
Boston University School of Management alumni
Hebrew University of Jerusalem Faculty of Social Sciences alumni
Israeli civil servants
Israeli Jews
Israeli people of Australian-Jewish descent
People from Melbourne
University of Melbourne alumni